The discography of Canadian rock band Japandroids consists of three studio albums, one compilation album, two extended plays, ten singles, and two music videos.

After self-releasing two EPs, Japandroids signed to independent Canadian label Unfamiliar Records. Their debut album, Post-Nothing, was released in Canada on April 28, 2009. Pitchfork awarded 'Best New Music' to both the album and lead single "Young Hearts Spark Fire", helping to expose the band to a large audience outside of Canada. Japandroids were subsequently signed to Polyvinyl, who re-released the album worldwide on August 4, 2009. Many of the un-included tracks that the duo had written for the album were later recorded and released in 2010 as series of limited edition 7" singles. These tracks include "Art Czars", "Younger Us", and "Heavenward Grand Prix". The same year, Japandroids re-released their first two EPs as a compilation titled No Singles.

Japandroids' second album, Celebration Rock, was released by Polyvinyl on June 5, 2012, preceded by a limited edition 7" of the album's first single "The House That Heaven Built". The album was released to widespread critical acclaim, appearing on many year-end best-of lists. The Globe and Mail named it the best Canadian album of 2012, while CBC declared it the best rock album of the year, later ranking it #91 on its list of The 100 Greatest Canadian Albums Ever. Their third album, Near to the Wild Heart of Life, was released on January 27, 2017, by ANTI-.

Albums

Studio albums

Compilation albums

Extended plays

Singles

Music videos

Notes

References 

General
 
 
 
Specific

Discographies of Canadian artists
Rock music group discographies